The Cima di Pian Guarnei (also known as Pizzo Quadro) is a mountain of the Lepontine Alps on the Swiss-Italian border.

References

External links
 Cima de Pian Guarnei on Hikr

Mountains of the Alps
Mountains of Switzerland
Mountains of Italy
Italy–Switzerland border
International mountains of Europe
Mountains of Graubünden
Lepontine Alps